Marc Fournier (born 12 November 1994 in Alençon) is a French former professional cyclist, who rode professionally between 2016 and 2019 for the  and  teams. He was named in the startlist for the 2017 Vuelta a España.

Major results

2012
 3rd Road race, National Junior Road Championships
2013
 2nd Overall Boucles de la Mayenne
1st Young rider classification
2015
 1st Stage 1 Le Triptyque des Monts et Châteaux
 2nd Time trial, National Under-23 Road Championships
 9th Grand Prix de la ville de Nogent-sur-Oise
2016
 1st  Overall Circuit de la Sarthe
1st  Young rider classification
1st Stage 1
 3rd Duo Normand (with Johan Le Bon)

Grand Tour general classification results timeline

References

External links

 
 
 

1994 births
Living people
French male cyclists
21st-century French people